"John Kettley Is a Weatherman" is a 1988 novelty record by the band A Tribe of Toffs, from Sunderland, UK.  The song peaked at 21 in the UK Singles Chart.

The John Kettley referred to in the title is a British weatherman, who at the time presented national forecasts on BBC Television.

The track was played on BBC Children's TV after being discovered by researcher Jane Louise who, on picking the single at random from the post bag commented that the 'kids would love this one'.

On 19 July 2022 (the hottest day recorded in the UK) Radio X DJ Chris Moyles played the song after a clip of John Kettley discussing the weather featured in the 7am news, and Chris subsequently ‘campaigned’ for his listeners to buy it and it reached number 1 in the UK iTunes chart.

People name-checked in the song

TV weather forecasters:
 John Kettley
 Michael Fish
 Bill Giles
 Ian McCaskill
 Wincey Willis 
 Bernard Davey

Other individuals:
 Ayrton Senna, racing driver
 Peter Snow, TV presenter and journalist
 Mark Barano
 Simon Parkin, TV and radio presenter
 Eric Lane, American football player
 Jonathan Ross, TV presenter
 Lester Piggott, jockey
 David Icke, TV sports presenter
 Richard Keys, TV sports presenter
 Debbie Thrower, TV presenter
 Johnny Marr, guitarist with The Smiths 
 David Steel, Liberal Democrat politician or more likely David Steele, Northamptonshire and England cricketer
 Chuck Knox, American football coach
 Andy Crane, children's TV presenter

References

1988 singles
Novelty songs
Songs about television
Songs about occupations
1988 songs
List songs
Cultural depictions of weather presenters
Cultural depictions of British men